Besa e kuqe (The red pledge) is a 1982 Albanian film. It was directed by Pirro Milkani with music by Zef Çoba.

Cast
Roza Anagnosti		
Ilirjan Fatkoja		
Xhevdet Ferri		
Astrit Hasani		
Elez Kadrija		
Tinka Kurti	
Eduard Makri
Robert Ndrenika	
Petrit Malaj
Bep Shiroka
David Elmasllari

See also
Besa (Albanian culture)

References

External links
 

1982 films
1982 drama films
Albanian-language films
Albanian drama films